The Graham School (or TGS) is a tuition-free public 4-year high school (grades 9–12) charter school located in Columbus, Ohio, United States. Its focus is experiential learning in a small-school setting where all students are known by all staff members.

External links
http://www.thegrahamschool.org/

High schools in Columbus, Ohio
Public high schools in Ohio
Charter schools in Ohio